Qaleh-ye Bar Panj is a village in Badakhshan Province in north-eastern Afghanistan.

It is located on the border with Tajikistan.

See also
Badakhshan Province

References

External links
Satellite map at Maplandia.com

Populated places in Shighnan District
Villages in Afghanistan